M. imbricata may refer to:
 Meladema imbricata, a beetle species endemic to Spain
 Micromyrtus imbricata, Benth., a shrub species in the genus Micromyrtus endemic to Australia

See also
 Imbricata